Mishna Wolff is an American writer and humorist. Her 2009 memoir I'm Down focused on childhood and race.

Early life 
Wolff grew up in Seattle, Washington. When her parents divorced, she found herself a white girl in a black neighborhood with a white father who expected her to integrate into the black community the way he had. She later wrote about these experiences in her memoir, I'm Down.

Career 
After having a humorous piece published in BlackBook Magazine, Wolff began performing on stage at Luna Lounge and the Upright Citizens Brigade. There she honed her comedic skills and performed personal essays in the LA storytelling series "Sit 'n Spin". She has been featured on VH1, Comedy Central, Air America and NPR. Her one-person show I'm Down was the basis of her memoir of the same name. Mishna Wolff was one of the 2009 Sundance Screenwriting Lab Fellows.

I'm Down 
Wolff's I'm Down: A Memoir was published by St. Martin's Press in 2009 and was a national best seller.

In 2011, KCBD of Lubbock, Texas, ran a story about I'm Downs being littered with profanity and inappropriate for Lubbock County English students. The book was removed from classrooms pending formal school district review. The school board voted unanimously to continue teaching it. One of the principals even assigned it to all his administrators.

I'm Down was chosen as Florida International University's Common Reader 2012–2013, and the Common Reader for Colorado Mountain College for 2013-2014. Wolff was a guest speaker at both colleges.

She received a Sundance-Indian Paintbrush screenwriting fellowship in 2012.

Personal life
Wolff was married to comic Marc Maron, and their divorce was the subject of his one-man show Scorching the Earth. The marriage was a frequent topic in his stand-up, podcasts, and one-man shows. Maron characterized his own behavior during their marriage as emotionally abusive.

She later married screenwriter Jeremy Doner; the couple have two children.

References

External links 
 Mishna Wolff homepage

American humorists
Living people
21st-century American memoirists
Year of birth missing (living people)
Place of birth missing (living people)
American women memoirists
Women humorists
21st-century American women writers
Writers from Seattle